"Anatomy of Monotony" is a poem from the second edition (1931)
of Wallace Stevens's first book of poetry,
Harmonium. Unlike most of
the poems in this collection, it was first published in 1931, so it is
restricted by copyright until 2025 in America and similar
jurisdictions, because of legislation like the
Sonny Bono Copyright Term Extension Act. However, it is quoted here in full, as justified by
fair use for the purpose of scholarly commentary.

Interpretation
The poet conceives us as evolving and increasingly civilized products of an
earthly process. Indeed the earth itself is growing and growing old,
while we sport our complex bodies and venture ever more sophisticated
desires. Human experience is a kind of illusion engendered by our
evolved sense organs, vulnerable to "the mother's death" and the cold
death of the universe. The spirit sees this and is aggrieved, for it
would harbor experience in some place that transcends nature, free from
the contingencies of earth and universe.

The poem can be read as ironic, as calling into question the pretension
of 'the spirit'. This reading is supported by the naturalistic tenor
of the Harmonium collection as a whole, and specifically by the
parallel of "Invective Against Swans".

Notes

References 

 Stevens, Holly. Letters of Wallace Stevens. 1966: Alfred A. Knopf

1931 poems
American poems
Poetry by Wallace Stevens